You Can Be Anyone This Time Around is an album by Timothy Leary released in April 1970. The disc features three "raps" by Leary backed with psychedelic music. The purpose of the album was to raise funds for Leary's political candidacy for Governor of California.

The album includes musical contributions from Jimi Hendrix, Stephen Stills, John Sebastian, and Buddy Miles recorded during an all-night jam session at the Record Plant.

The title track and "What Do You Turn On When You Turn On" both feature sampling of music by other artists, including The Beatles, The Rolling Stones, and Ravi Shankar. This is one of the earliest known examples of sampling on a commercial record.

Track listing 
All tracks written by Timothy Leary.

Personnel 

Timothy Leary – spoken word, writer
Jimi Hendrix – bass guitar
Buddy Miles – drums
John Sebastian – guitar
Stephen Stills – guitar
Intermedia Systems Corporation – production
Stanley Mouse – cover artwork
 Cindy Nelson – package design 
 David Greenberg – liner notes 
Jim Marshall — photography

References 

1970 albums
Timothy Leary albums
Rykodisc albums